Treasure Coast Square is a shopping mall in Martin County, Florida, United States. It comprises 115 stores, including anchor stores Dillard's, JCPenney, and Macy's, as well as a food court and Regal 16-screen movie theater. The mall is managed by Simon Property Group, and opened in 1987.

History
Developed by Edward J. DeBartolo, the mall opened in 1987 with original anchor tenants J. C. Penney, Jordan Marsh, and Lord & Taylor. The mall's opening caused the decline of the existing Martin Square Mall in nearby Stuart, from which J. C. Penney relocated, and Boca Mall (now known as Mizner Park) in Boca Raton.

The opening of the mall attracted nearly 800,000 square feet of new retail development in its area in the first ten years of opening.

References

External links 
 Treasure Coast Square Mall home page

Simon Property Group
Shopping malls in Florida
Buildings and structures in Martin County, Florida
Tourist attractions in Martin County, Florida
Shopping malls established in 1987